Martin Švec may refer to:

 Martin Švec (squash player)
 Martin Švec (footballer)